William Miskey Singerly (December 27, 1832 – February 27, 1898) was a Philadelphia businessman and newspaper publisher.

Singerly was born in Philadelphia in 1832.  His father Joseph Singerly was instrumental in the creation of the city's street car system.  Singerly graduated from high school in 1850 and worked in a produce commission house.  He then worked with his father in the street car business and spent some time in that field in Chicago.

Singerly purchased the small The Philadelphia Record newspaper in 1877 with a circulation of about 5,000 daily, and transformed it into a large circulation one-cent daily.  By 1894, it had a circulation over 160,000.

He was also involved in real estate development, overseeing the building of over 1,000 new homes.

Horse racing
William Singerly bred and raced Standardbred and Thoroughbred horses. His best known was Morello who won the 1892 Coney Island Futurity Stakes at Sheepshead Bay Race Track, the then richest and most important event in Thoroughbred racing. Morello raced under the name of Singerly's nom de course Elkton Stable as well as his trainer Frank Van Ness. The colt would earn both American Co-Champion Two-Year-Old Male Horse and Three-Year-Old Co-Champion honors.

In addition to properties he held in Kentucky and Montgomery County, PA., he bought a 300-acre farm outside Elkton, MD in 1888 to breed and race standard-bred and thoroughbred horses.  Singerly called it the Elkton Stock Farm and at the time of the purchase he had 14 "high blooded young stock" in Lexington, KY, which he desired to have trained near Philadelphia.

Politics
A staunch Democrat, he ran for Pennsylvania governor in 1894 but was defeated by Daniel H. Hastings.

Financial reversals and death
After suffering significant financial difficulties including the failure of the Chestnut Street National Bank (of which he was president) in December 1897, Singerly died in February 1898.  He was buried in Laurel Hill Cemetery in Philadelphia.

References

External links

1832 births
1898 deaths
19th-century American businesspeople
19th-century American journalists
19th-century American male writers
American newspaper publishers (people)
American male journalists
American racehorse owners and breeders
Burials at Laurel Hill Cemetery (Philadelphia)
Businesspeople from Philadelphia
Journalists from Pennsylvania
Pennsylvania Democrats